RCAN3 is a gene that in humans encodes the Calcipressin-3 protein. 

Calcipressin-3 is a protein that in humans is encoded by the RCAN3 gene and is a member of the Calcipressin family of proteins.

Expression 
RCAN3 is highly expressed in the Cerebellar Hemisphere, Prostrate, and the Mucosa of the esophagus.

Orthologs 
RCAN3 was present in the common ancestor of all animals. As a result, orthologs are present in other species, including mice (Rcan3), chickens (RCAN3), and zebrafish (rcan3).

Clinical Significance 
Calcipressin-3, along with the other two Calcipressin proteins have been identified as possible contributing factors to Down Syndrome in humans.

Summary box
N/A

See also
 RCAN1 
 RCAN2

References

Further reading